Paradox Interactive AB is a video game publisher based in Stockholm, Sweden. The company started out as the video game division of Target Games and then Paradox Entertainment (now Cabinet Entertainment) before being spun out into an independent company in 2004. Through a combination of expanding internal studios, founding new studios and purchasing independent developers, the company has grown to comprise nine first-party development studios, including their flagship Paradox Development Studio, and acts as publisher for games from other developers.

Paradox is best known for releasing historically themed strategy video games, especially grand strategy games, and has published strategy games in different settings, as well as games of other genres such as role-playing video games and management simulators. They typically continue development of their games after initial release with the creation of downloadable content, and are also known for creating games that are easy to mod.

Outside of video games, Paradox has created board games based on several of its titles, and owns the rights to the tabletop role-playing game series World of Darkness since purchasing White Wolf Publishing in 2015. They hold an annual convention, PDXCON, which has been open to the public since 2017.

History

Separation from Paradox Entertainment (1999–2004)
Paradox Interactive's origins started with Target Games, a Sweden-based board game company. Target had been producing board and tabletop role-playing games in the 1980s and 1990s, and ventured into video games. By the late 1990s, Target was struggling financially, and they ultimately folded into bankruptcy by 1999. The video game division spun off into a separate entity, Paradox Entertainment, which published video game adaptions of Target's games. Between 2000 and 2003, Paradox Entertainment released the first titles of several grand strategy games, including Europa Universalis, Hearts of Iron, Victoria: An Empire Under the Sun, and Crusader Kings. The company had several mediocre releases, including Gettysburg: Armored Warfare, an attempt by the studio to make a massively multiplayer online game on a triple-A scale, but which was released with numerous problems and was critically panned, costing several jobs by the developer.

By around 2003, Paradox Entertainment began buying the intellectual property rights to various franchises like Conan the Barbarian from Robert E. Howard and Solomon Kane. Fredrik Wester, current CEO of Paradox Interactive, stated that around 2003 he had been brought aboard by Paradox Entertainment to help write their business plan, which included the drive to transform their video game division into a triple-A studio. Wester cautioned them about this, pointing back to the failure of Gettysburg. The Paradox Entertainment executives did not take this advice well and decided it would be better to shutter the video games division and focus exclusively on licensing their acquired brands. Instead, Wester, along with the Paradox Entertainment CEO Theodore Bergquist, bought out the video games division retaining the Swedish Paradox Development Studio and all seven of its developers including Johan Andersson. They gained all intellectual property rights to the studio's past games, forming Paradox Interactive in 2004.

Growth as a publisher (2005–2015)
One of the first titles that was planned by Paradox Interactive was Crusader Kings, another grand strategy title. Their publisher, Strategy First, filed for bankruptcy about two months into its release, costing Paradox revenues from those sales as well as the lack of a North American distributor. After the launch of the digital storefront Steam around 2003, Wester experimented with digital marketplaces by offering downloadable content for Victoria via their website. The experiment proved successful, and subsequently in 2006 the company launched Paradox On Demand, a digital storefront with several of Paradox's back-catalog for sale. This eventually was renamed as GamersGate later in 2006. To help support it, Paradox looked to sign on games from developers as to bolster the company's reputation as a world-class video game publisher. Wester stated in 2013 that many of these games were "terribly bad", but that some proved to be strong performers, such as Mount & Blade. GamersGate eventually was spun off to be its own entity in 2008, while Paradox continued to acquire additional titles to fill its distributor catalogue which helped to finance continued development of grand strategy titles from the Paradox Development Studio. By 2013, the company had reached 100 employees, and established new offices in Stockholm, Sweden.

Paradox Interactive continued to publish numerous games from smaller developers over the next several years, finding success in games like Magicka from Arrowhead Game Studios (the publisher's first title to break 1 million copies sold) and War of the Roses from Fatshark. Wester and others in Paradox admitted in 2013 that this approach had been ambitious and led to issues with quality control in the resulting games, leading to a general impression about Paradox games being buggy. The publisher had greenlit and invested in several titles by its internal studios without careful review that failed to pan out, such as East vs. West, a spin-off from the Hearts of Iron series, By 2014, the company had made a decision to become much more selective of which titles to publish, making sure they were able to provide the necessary quality control support each title needed before agreeing to publish. Crusader Kings II in 2012 was one of the first games developed and published by Paradox with more attention focused on development timelines and testing to avoid past mistakes, and Paradox has since followed a similar model on its future titles.

One of Paradox Interactive's more notable publishing deals was their agreement with Colossal Order in 2011 to publish their Cities in Motion transportation simulation game and later its sequel Cities in Motion 2. Colossal Order ultimately wanted to produce a city simulation game to challenge Electronic Arts SimCity series but Paradox had expressed concerns regarding the competition. However, after the release of the 2013 SimCity game and the poor reception it received due to a variety of gameplay changes and difficulties with online services required to play the game, Paradox greenlit Colossal Order for its city simulation game, Cities: Skylines, which was released in 2015 and has sold over 12 million copies by June 2022.

Another collaboration for Paradox was with Obsidian Entertainment. Obsidian, having struggled financially, crowd-sourced the development of a new game, Pillars of Eternity, and entered into a publishing deal for it through Paradox. Obsidian published their next title, Tyranny through Paradox.

Paradox opened its second internal development studio, Paradox Arctic, located in Umeå, Sweden, formed from former members of EA DICE and Starbreeze Studios, in 2014.

Going public (2016)
In March 2016, CEO Fredrik Wester stated in an interview with Di Digital that Paradox Interactive has launched the IPO process. The company stated their intention to complete this process within a year, with the goal of spreading ownership between employees and players of their games and "looking for long-term owners who want to take part in the Paradox journey".

On 31 May 2016, trading in Paradox Interactive commenced on Nasdaq First North under the ticker PDX. Wester continued to hold 33.3% of the shares of the company, while investment firm Spiltan held to 30.5% of the shares. Finances created by the offering allowed Paradox to begin several acquisitions of various studios and intellectual properties.

Continued development (2017–present) 
Paradox announced the opening of its third internal studio, Paradox Thalassic located in Malmö, Sweden, in May 2017. The studio was established to develop mobile games based on Paradox's properties.

Wester stepped down as CEO in August 2018, but he remained executive chairman of the board while board member Ebba Ljungerud took his place as CEO. The move was billed as giving Wester more ability to look for growth opportunities while Ljungerud handled the day-to-day operations of the company, which had since grown to about 300 employees since its foundation.

In March 2019, Paradox announced the opening of Paradox Tectonic, located in Berkeley, California, with Rod Humble serving as studio lead. Another new studio, Paradox Tinto, was opened in June 2020 in Barcelona, Spain, led by Johan Andersson to oversee Europa Universalis IV development and other Paradox grand strategy titles.

In June 2020, Paradox became one of the first major publishers to announce support for unionization efforts when it concluded a labour agreement with its employees in its Swedish divisions and the Swedish unions Swedish Confederation of Professional Associations and Unionen. In 2021, Paradox committed to overhauling its online forums, due to challenges in engaging its community.

On 1 September 2021, Ljungerud resigned as CEO "due to differing views on the company's strategy going forward," with the then executive chairman of the board and former CEO Fredrik Wester taking her place and resigning from his position on the board. Following this, Håkan Sjunnesson, at the time deputy chairman of the board, became chairman. At the end of September 2021, the company announced it was cancelling development on several unannounced products to focus on "proven game niches", leaving 15 projects in development. According to Wester, the company's focus remains on their strategy and simulation games, and that they have "sharpened our pipeline further to ensure that the projects with the highest potential have the resources necessary for the best possible development".

That same September, Swedish publication Breakit reported that an internal survey from Paradox employees found 44% of the 133 responds had reported some type of "mistreatment" in the company, and that many respondents believed there was a "culture of silence" at the firm. The following month, a report from Svenska Dagbladet further investigated this situation, finding that the female employees believed the company was "clearly male-dominated", and with several men in senior management positions in roles involved in harassment and mistreatment of employees. Eurogamer also spoke to Paradox employees, confirming these findings. Paradox replied to these reports that while the prior survey was too small a fraction of their total employee count to take action on, they have hired an independent auditor to review their company culture, starting with their Sweden operations. In February 2022 published the audit on its webpage.

The company launched Paradox Arc in August 2022 as a new publishing label aimed for games from smaller studios.

Studios
Paradox operates nine internal studios:

Video games

Paradox is the publisher of its internally developed single and multi-player grand strategy games series; Imperator: Rome, Crusader Kings III, Europa Universalis IV, Victoria 3, Hearts of Iron IV, and Stellaris.

Paradox has also published games for 1C Company, Arrowhead Game Studios, BattleGoat Studios, NeocoreGames, and TaleWorlds Entertainment.

Board games
At the 2018 PDXCon, Paradox announced it was working with board game designers and publishers to produce a number of board games based on their video game properties, including Europa Universalis, Crusader Kings, Hearts of Iron, and Cities: Skylines.

During PDXCON Remixed, Paradox announced a kickstarter of a Prison Architect board game, designed by Noralie Lubbers and David Turczi.

Events

PDXCON
Prior to 2016, Paradox Interactive had invited members of the gaming industry press to Stockholm to preview upcoming titles at an annual press day. Starting in 2017, Paradox transformed this to a weekend event opened to the public called PDXCon. PDXCon 2017 was held in May at the Gamla Riksarkivet in Stockholm, and included four hundred gamers alongside the press at the event. For the 2018 PDXCon in May, Paradox expanded the public attendance to 800 gamers. The 2019 PDXCon was held in Berlin in October 18–20, 2019, giving them access to a larger space and more ready access for gamers to attend. On April 21, 2022, Paradox announced via Twitter that PDXCON would be returning in September.

Paradox Insider
Paradox Insider is an annual gaming online showcase held by Paradox Interactive to promote its major franchises including Europa Universalis, Hearts of Iron, Victoria, and Crusader Kings.

The first Insider event was held in June 2020, and since then, all of the events have been about of the Game Dev Direct showcase. The online event features game-related announcements, previews of upcoming Paradox Interactive games and content, Q&A sessions and panels.

On May 11, 2020, Paradox tweeted stating they have teamed up with Guerrilla Collective to be a part of their digital multi-day gaming pressing conference indie studios and smaller publishers. Insider would debut in June 2020.

On February 11, 2021, Paradox announced that Insider would return again on March 13, 2021, and would be part of Game Dev Direct showcase.

The gaming announcements included; Surviving Mars being placed in active development with Abstraction Games taking control, Empire of Sin going to Xbox Game Pass, for both console and PC, on March 18, and a new DLC expansion for Crusader Kings III called "The Northern Lords Flavor Pack" and that set to be made available on March 16 for $5.

Paradox also announced for Stellaris the "Lithoids Species Pack" would be available for console on March 25. While also showing off the Nemesis expansion, which released on April 15.

Game characteristics

Grand strategy 
Paradox Interactive has generally focused on publishing grand strategy games made by its subsidiary, Paradox Development Studio. Grand strategy games are often played on a real-world map, marked by the use of standard real-time elements but with an ability to make any and all changes even while paused. The focus of each game is different, but generally a player must manage the economy, commerce, internal politics, diplomacy, technological development, and military forces of a nation. The games are usually nonlinear with no set victory condition.

Examples of these grand strategy games in Paradox' catalogue include Stellaris, the Europa Universalis series, the Crusader Kings series, and the Hearts of Iron series.

Other genres 

Along with grand strategy games, Paradox's catalogue has come to include simulation and management games, such as the Cities in Motion series and Cities: Skylines, and role-playing video games such as Pillars of Eternity. The publisher has ventured into other genres in the period between 2011 and 2014, but have since shifted focus back to these three core areas; according to Shams Jorjani, the vice president of business development, "We had this vision of people buying a Paradox game without knowing what the game was; that 'Paradox' should be a guarantee for a type of game experience". The period from 2011 to 2014 was marked by the publication of the first Magicka game in 2011, itself having been greenlit for publishing after seeing the success of the Mount & Blade series in 2008, which did not quite fit their grand strategy profile. Magicka had been successful, so between 2013 and 2014, the publisher greenlit a number of different titles from across a number of genres, which, on retrospective, the publisher found that they could not properly manage or promote well, leading them to limit themselves to three core genres.

Post-content model
Paradox supports games following their release with a long tail of updates to their games often several years after release. Some of these are free updates or downloadable content (DLC), and many add large game changing elements to the game and the way it is played. Paradox board member Ebba Ljungerud justified this part of their business model by stating "We want to make really great games for our fans, and we can't do that if we don't charge something for the development". Players have complained of Paradox' tendency to have a large number of paid DLC for its games, some which become required to be able to play with others. Ljungerud has stated that it knows this approach to DLC is unconventional and inundating for newcomers and can be improved. However, Wester asserted their current approach is a "fair and balanced" method, as alongside the paid DLC, they also release free updates that add new gameplay features and quality-of-life improvements to the title, so that all owners of the game can benefit from this approach regardless if they purchase the DLC.

Paradox trialed a subscription model approach to the extended content for these games, first as a limited beta in 2020 with Europa Universalis 4, before releasing a full subscription program in February 2021 for Crusader Kings 2. A subscription gives access to all DLC for the subscribed title for a  monthly subscription fee. A Paradox spokesman said this was "an affordable way for players to experience the entire Crusader Kings 2 catalogue without having to weigh which items they would prefer to purchase". A full subscription program for Europa Universalis 4 was issued in March 2021, and a program was also released for Hearts of Iron 4 on 15 February 2022.

Modding 
Paradox tries to make games that are open and easy to edit (moddable), from tweaking a saved game to creating a new scenario. Modding can be accomplished with simple tools and basic knowledge of scripting. To assist modders to figure out how to edit the game on their own, the Paradox forums provide fan-compiled libraries of "how to" advice. Paradox worked with Microsoft to develop Paradox Mods, an open modding platform that allows the same user-created mods to work both on Microsoft Windows and Xbox One system, with initial testing being done through Surviving Mars starting in February 2019.

Acquisitions

White Wolf 
Paradox Interactive purchased White Wolf Publishing's assets, including World of Darkness and Vampire: The Masquerade, from CCP Games in October 2015. White Wolf became a self-operating subsidiary of Paradox Interactive with its own management and goals.

In January 2017, White Wolf announced its partnership with video game publisher Focus Home Interactive for the video game adaptation of Werewolf: The Apocalypse, a tabletop role-playing game set in the World of Darkness. It was developed by the game development studio Cyanide and released on PC and consoles on February 4, 2021, as Werewolf: The Apocalypse - Earthblood.

In November 2018, as a result of backlash generated by material pertaining to "murder of gay Chechens" published in a Vampire: The Masquerade Fifth Edition source book, it was announced that White Wolf would no longer function as an entity separate from its parent company, and would cease developing and publishing products internally.

Studio acquisitions 
Paradox Interactive acquired the Dutch game development studio Triumph Studios, the creator of the Age of Wonders and Overlord series, in June 2017. The acquisition was considered to be a good fit by both commentators and the involved companies, based on similarities in product genres and corporate culture.

Paradox Interactive acquired Harebrained Schemes, the maker of Shadowrun Returns and the Paradox-published game BattleTech, in June 2018 for a fixed price of US$7,500,000 and 25% of the earnings of Harebrained Schemes excluding publishing cost in the next 5 years, to the extent they exceed the fixed purchasing price.

Paradox acquired Paris-based Playrion Game Studio, specializing in mobile game development, in July 2020, making it its eighth internal studio. Paradox stated the acquisition will help them expand into the mobile games marketplace. Also in July 2020, Paradox acquired Iceflake Studios out of Tampere, Finland, which had been developing Surviving the Aftermath with Paradox as the publisher previously.

Intellectual property acquisitions 
In January 2019, Paradox acquired the intellectual property rights to the Prison Architect series from developer Introversion Software, with plans to continue to expand more games in the same theme. Introversion had stated they had taken the series as far as they could and believed that Paradox's purchase would ultimately help the series in the future.

References

External links
 Official website
 Official Paradox wiki

Video game publishers
Swedish companies established in 1999
Video game companies established in 1999
Companies based in Stockholm
Video game companies of Sweden
Tencent
2016 initial public offerings
Companies listed on Nasdaq Stockholm
Paradox Interactive